"Insane" is a song by American nu metal band Korn. It was released as a promotional single from their twelfth studio album The Serenity of Suffering.

Background 
Insane was released alongside an accompanying music video, directed by Ryan Valdez, based around the concept of memento mori. Scenes featured in the video involve a deceased head coming back to life as a photographer, with an alleged "demonic camera", prepares to capture it.

Themes and composition 

"The song Insane is another chapter in my fucking crazy life. It’s about watching things happen and fall apart around me, and there’s nothing I can do about it. I’ve got to the point I don’t relate with anyone that’s normal anymore. I can only relate to people who are going through insanity, or there’s something wrong with them. That’s how I deal. I wrote the lyrics and I looked at them like, ‘What the hell does this mean?’ I just fit with the vibe of the song. It’s one of the heaviest songs on the record. I love it." - Davis

The song has been compared to some of Korn's earlier material.

Personnel 
 Jonathan Davis – lead vocals
 James "Munky" Shaffer – guitars
 Brian "Head" Welch – guitars
 Reginald "Fieldy" Arvizu – bass
 Ray Luzier – drums

Charts

References 

2016 songs
2016 singles
Korn songs
Songs written by Jonathan Davis
Songs written by James Shaffer
Songs written by Brian Welch
Songs written by Reginald Arvizu
Roadrunner Records singles